Anastrophyllaceae is a family of liverworts belonging to the order Jungermanniales.

Genera
Genera:
 Anastrepta (Lindb.) Schiffn.
 Anastrophyllum (Spruce) Steph.
 Barbilophozia Loeske
 Biantheridion (Grolle) Konstant. & Vilnet
 Chandonanthus Mitt.
 Crossocalyx Meyl.
 Gymnocolea (Dumort.) Dumort.
 Hamatostrepta Váňa & D.G.Long
 Hattoria R.M.Schust.
 Isopaches H.Buch
 Neoorthocaulis L.Söderstr., De Roo & Hedd.
 Orthocaulis H. Buch
 Plicanthus R.M.Schust.
 Schizophyllopsis Váňa & L.Söderstr.
 Schljakovia Konstant. & Vilnet
 Schljakovianthus Konstant. & Vilnet
 Sphenolobopsis R.M.Schust. & N.Kitag.
 Sphenolobus (Lindb.) Berggr.
 Tetralophozia (R.M.Schust.) Schljakov
 Zantenia (S.Hatt.) Váňa & J.J.Engel.

References

Jungermanniales
Liverwort families